Valerie Sinason is a British poet, writer, psychoanalyst and psychotherapist  who is known for promoting the idea that people with a developmental disability can benefit from psychoanalysis and that satanic ritual abuse is widely practiced in the UK. She ran the workshop dealing with intellectual disability at the Tavistock Clinic for twenty years and also worked for 16 years as a consultant research psychotherapist at St George's Hospital Medical School. She is a Trustee of the Institute for Psychotherapy and Disability.

Psychoanalysis and the developmentally disabled 
Since 1979, Sinason has claimed that severely developmentally-disabled people benefit by psychoanalysis. She saw her patients as having a secondary handicap resulting from their attempts to adapt to society's attitudes toward them.

Satanic ritual abuse 
In 1994, Sinason edited a collection of essays entitled Treating Survivors of Satanist Abuse that claimed satanic ritual abuse existed in the United Kingdom and that she had treated victims. Satanic ritual abuse is now considered to be a moral panic. Despite this and a three-year Department of Health inquiry by the anthropologist Jean La Fontaine into 84 alleged cases of ritual abuse that found no evidence to support such claims, Sinason claimed in 2001 and 2002 she had clinical evidence for the widespread practice of satanic ritual abuse in the United Kingdom.  Her own report on the topic, prepared with colleague Robert Hale, was funded as a pilot study by the Department of Health. It was released to the public under the Freedom of Information  Act, and the Department of Health stated in response to an inquiry by a reporter that they do not believe the Sinason-Hale report rendered LaFontaine's report invalid.  LaFontaine commented on the story saying "It is not surprising to me that patients who are having treatment by Valerie Sinason would produce stories that echo such topical issues as the recent trial for receiving internet pornography and the publicity for the film Hannibal. There is good research that shows the "memories" of abuse are produced in and by the therapy."

Bibliography 
 
 
 Memory in dispute, 2018.
 The truth about trauma and dissociation: everything you didn't want to know and were afraid to ask, Confer books, 2020.
 Mental handicap and the human condition: an analytic approach to intellectual disability, Free association books, 2010.
 Mental handicap and the human condition: new approach by the Tavistock, Free association books, 1992.
 Understanding your handicapped child, firefly books, 1997.
 Night shift: New poems by Valerie Sinason, 1995.

References

External links
 Article discussing Sinason's involvement with a satanic ritual abuse patient

Living people
British psychotherapists
Developmental disabilities
Satanic ritual abuse
British psychoanalysts
People involved with disability
Year of birth missing (living people)